Flavio Cipolla and Simone Vagnozzi were the champions in 2008. Cipolla chose to not play this year and Vagnozzi partnered up with Uros Vico. They lost to Paolo Lorenzi and Giancarlo Petrazzuolo in the first round.
Rubén Ramírez Hidalgo and José Antonio Sánchez-de Luna won in the final 6–4, 6–2, against Martín Alund and Guillermo Hormazábal.

Seeds

Draw

Draw

References
 Doubles Draw

Alessandria Challenger- Doubles
Alessandria Challenger